Hayrick is a relatively large sometimes thatched outdoor pile of hay. 

Hayrick may also refer to:

Hayrick Butte, a subglacial volcano in Linn County, Oregon
Hayrick Island, a small rock mass in the Terra Firma Islands, off the west coast of Graham Land, Antarctica
Henry Hayrick, burgess for Warwick County, Virginia (1644–1645)
Thomas Hayrick, member of the Virginia House of BurgessesAssembly, Elizabeth City County, Virginia (1629–1630)

See also
Herrick (disambiguation)